Mohamed Berrahal (born 24 May 1979) is an Algerian athlete who competes in disability athletics in the T/F51 category. Berrahal broke the world record in the F51 category to become the Paralympic Champion in London. At the 2013 World Championships he broke his own world record as he won a combined F51–53 event in the discus.

References

World record holders in Paralympic athletics
1979 births
Living people
Medalists at the 2012 Summer Paralympics
Paralympic bronze medalists for Algeria
Paralympic gold medalists for Algeria
Paralympic athletes of Algeria
Athletes (track and field) at the 2012 Summer Paralympics
Medalists at the 2016 Summer Paralympics
Paralympic medalists in athletics (track and field)
Athletes (track and field) at the 2020 Summer Paralympics
21st-century Algerian people